Heart's Horizon is a studio album by American singer and musician Al Jarreau. It was released in 1988 through Reprise Records. It reached No. 75 on the Billboard 200.

The song "Killer Love" was intended to be used in the film Skin Deep; it was omitted at the last minute.

Track listing

Personnel 
 Al Jarreau – lead vocals, backing vocals (8), Akai MPC60 sampling (8), E-mu Emulator III sampling (8)
 Bobby Caldwell – synthesizers (1)
 George Duke – synthesizer overdubs (1, 2), acoustic piano (2, 7), Yamaha TX816 (3, 10, 11), Roland D-550 (3, 11), Synclavier (3, 4, 6, 7, 9–12), Rhodes (10), electronic drum pads (10), harmonica (10), keyboards (11), Roland S-50 (11), guitar (11), voice (11)
 Jay Graydon – synthesizers (1, 4, 6, 12)
 Dennis Matkosky – synthesizers (1), Hammond organ (1), Yamaha TX816 (9), Roland D-550 (9), E-mu Emulator III (9), Moog bass (9), drum programming (9)
 John Van Tongeren – synthesizers (1)
 Russell Ferrante – keyboards (2, 3)
 Randy Goodrum – synthesizers (4, 12)
 Gardner Cole – synthesizers (6)
 Philippe Saisse – keyboards (8)
 Paul Jackson Jr. – guitar (1-4, 6, 11), rhythm guitar (9), acoustic guitar (12)
 Kevin Chokan – guitar (2, 3)
 Michael Landau – guitar (4, 6), lead guitar (9)
 Earl Klugh – acoustic guitar (7)
 "Ready" Freddie Washington – bass guitar (1, 2, 3, 9, 10, 11), bass overdubs (6)
 Abraham Laboriel – bass guitar (4, 7)
 Stanley Clarke – acoustic bass (12)
 John Robinson – drums (1, 4, 6, 9, 11, 12)
 Ricky Lawson – drums (2, 3, 7)
 Carlos Vega – drums (10)
 Paulinho da Costa – percussion (4, 7, 12)
 Marc Russo – saxophone (1)
 David Sanborn – alto saxophone (2)
 Brandon Fields – saxophone solo (6) 
 Dan Higgins – tenor saxophone (11)
 Kirk Whalum – tenor sax solo (11)
 Lew McCreary – trombone (6)
 Bill Reichenbach, Jr. – trombone (6)
 Gary Grant – trumpet (6)
 Jerry Hey – trumpet (6, 11)
 Bill Champlin – backing vocals (1), BGV arrangement (9), E-mu Emulator II (9)
 Tamara Champlin – backing vocals (1)
 Tommy Funderburk – backing vocals (1)
 Alex Brown – backing vocals (2, 3, 6)
 Carl Carwell – backing vocals (2, 3, 6)
 Lynn Davis – backing vocals (2, 3, 6, 9, 11)
 Phillip Ingram – backing vocals (2)
 Josie James – backing vocals (2, 3, 6, 9)
 Howard Smith – backing vocals (2)
 Bobby McFerrin – lead vocals (5)
 Marcy Levy – backing vocals (7)
 Bobby Kimball – backing vocals (9)
 Phil Perry – backing vocals (9, 11)
 Roy Galloway – backing vocals (11)
 Gene Reed – backing vocals (11)
 Vonda Shepard – backing vocals (11)
 Patricia Unaitis – backing vocals (11)
 Fred White – backing vocals (11)

Production 
 Producers – George Duke (Tracks 1-7 & 9–12); Jay Graydon (Tracks 1, 4, 5, 6 & 12); Philippe Saisse (Track 8); Dennis Matkosky (Track 9).
 Recording – Erik Zobler (Tracks 1–4, 6, 7 & 9–12); Brian Malouf (Track 5); Eric Calvi and Gary Wagner (Track 8).
 Lead vocals and keyboards on Tracks 1, 4 & 12 and saxophone on Track 6 recorded by Jay Graydon.
 Assistant Recording – Kevin Fisher, Julie Last and Joe Schiff (Tracks 1–4, 6, 7 & 9–12); Kristin Connolly and Shawna Stobie (Tracks 5 & 8).
 Mixing – Erik Zobler
 Mix Assistant – Steve Holroyd
 Tracks 1-7 & 9-12 mixed at Ocean Way Recording (Los Angeles, CA); Track 8 mixed at Smoketree Ranch (Chatsworth, CA).
 Mastered by Stephen Marcussen at Precision Lacquer (Hollywood, CA).
 Keyboard Technician – Mike Burns
 Production Coordination – Bibi Green (recording) and Stephanie McCravey (mixing).
 Album Coordinator – Shirley Klein
 Art Direction and Design – Ph.D.
 Illustration – Ann Field
 Photography – Bonnie Schiffman
 Styling – Maria Sarno
 Management – Patrick Raines & Associates

Chart history

References

External links 
 

1988 albums
Al Jarreau albums
Reprise Records albums
Albums produced by George Duke